Josep Tarradellas i Joan, 1st Marquess of Tarradellas (19 February 1899 – 10 June 1988) was a Catalan politician known for his role as the first president of the Government of Catalonia (Generalitat de Catalunya), after its re-establishment in 1977 under the new Spanish Constitution and the end of the Francoist Dictatorship. He was appointed the role of 125th President of Catalonia in 1954 but spent 23 years in exile until 1977 when he was officially recognised as the President of Catalonia by the Spanish Government.

Biography
In 1931, Tarradellas became general secretary of the Republican Left of Catalonia (ERC). He also was deputy at the Cortes that year, Governance and Health councillor when Francesc Macià was President of the Generalitat of Catalonia as well as Public Services, Economy and Culture councillor during the Spanish Civil War.

Exiled to France since 1939, he became President of the Generalitat of Catalonia when Josep Irla resigned, in 1954.

On 23 October 1977, two years after Francisco Franco's death, the President of the Spanish Government Adolfo Suárez met him to negotiate the reestablishment of the Government of Catalonia, an event which occurred. The sentence pronounced at his arrival has become famous as a symbol: "Ciutadans de Catalunya, ja sóc aquí!" (Catalan for "Citizens of Catalonia, I am here at last!").

He was welcomed solemnly in Barcelona and set up a unity government. He finished his work with the elections for the Catalan Parliament (March 1980), and Jordi Pujol was elected in April.

On 24 July 1986 Tarradellas received the hereditary title marqués de Tarradellas (English: Marquess of Tarradellas) from King Juan Carlos I. Tarradellas died in Barcelona in 1988. The hereditary marquessate is now held by his son, who became the second marquess.

On 21 December 2018 the Government of Spain announced that Barcelona–El Prat Airport would be renamed after Tarradellas.

References

External links 

 Tarradellas, Josep. The financial work of the Generalitat de Catalunya. Discourse pronounced by the Honourable the Councillor of Finances Josep Tarradellas in the Parliament of Catalunya during the session of the 1st March 1938. Barcelona: 1938. 61 p.
 Web page of The "Montserrat Tarradellas i Macià" Archive at the Royal Abbey of Santa Maria de Poblet, in Catalonia.

|-

1899 births
1988 deaths
People from Baix Llobregat
Republican Left of Catalonia politicians
General Secretaries of the Republican Left of Catalonia
Presidents of the Government of Catalonia
Spanish people of the Spanish Civil War (Republican faction)
Exiles of the Spanish Civil War in France